Corey Wilson (born April 30, 1985) is an American politician and military veteran from Maine. A Republican, Wilson was elected to represent a portion of Augusta in the Maine House of Representatives in the November 2012 general election. He is a veteran of the Iraq War and served in the United States Marine Corps from 2002 to 2010.

During his term in office, he was noted for his service on the Criminal Justice and Public Safety Committee and described as a "maverick worth watching" by the Bangor Daily News.

Personal
Wilson was born on April 30, 1985, in Waterville and grew up in Albion and Clinton before settling at age 12 with his mother and 5 siblings in Fairfield. He has attended Southern New Hampshire University, where he has studied Healthcare Business. In 2012, he earned a B.S. in business management from Park University.

References

1985 births
Living people
People from Waterville, Maine
People from Fairfield, Maine
Politicians from Augusta, Maine
Republican Party members of the Maine House of Representatives
Park University alumni
Southern New Hampshire University alumni
United States Marines
People from Albion, Maine